Henry George Bruder Jr. (November 22, 1907 – June 29, 1970) was an American football player in the National Football League.  He played nine years with the Green Bay Packers from 1931 to 1939 and was inducted into the Green Bay Packers Hall of Fame in 1972.  Bruder attended Northwestern University, where he was a member of the Delta Upsilon fraternity.

He was part of the offensive line that blocked for Pro Football Hall of Fame back Johnny "Blood" McNally.

References

External links

1907 births
1970 deaths
People from Pekin, Illinois
American football offensive linemen
Northwestern Wildcats football players
Green Bay Packers players
Pittsburgh Steelers players